Alpino may refer to:

 The Alpini, the elite mountain warfare soldiers of the Italian Army
 Prospero Alpini, and Italian physician and botanist known by the author abbreviation "Alpino"
 The Alpino parser, a natural language analysis system for Dutch 
 R.N. Alpino, a Destroyer of the Regia Marina